Nuweiba (also spelled: Nueiba;) is a coastal town in the eastern part of Sinai Peninsula, Egypt, located on the coast of the Gulf of Aqaba.

History

Nuweiba castle (or Newibah castle), built on top of the remains of a still older castle in 1893, has been proposed as a UNESCO World Heritage site.

Geography
Nuweiba Port was built in 1985 on the Gulf of Aqaba, and serves as a ferry port as well, facilitating between Jordan and Egypt.

Climate
Köppen-Geiger climate classification system classifies its climate as hot desert (BWh).

Most precipitation falls in February.

Tourism

Between the town and the port are a strip of modern hotels, catering to beach holiday makers and divers. One km north of Nuweiba City, Tarabin village is well known for its Bedouin-style camps where cheap huts are available for rent. Further north, in the direction of Taba, are several other beaches with similar accommodation options.

Gallery

See also
 Arab Bridge Maritime
 Coloured Canyon
 Red Sea Riviera

References

External links 

Port cities and towns in Egypt
Populated places in South Sinai Governorate
Populated coastal places in Egypt
Former Israeli settlements in Sinai
Seaside resorts in Egypt
Tourist attractions in Egypt